Stakes Winner is a horse racing arcade video game developed by Saurus, with additional support from AM Factory, and originally published by SNK on September 27, 1995. In the game, players compete with either AI-controlled opponents or against other human players across multiple races. Though it was initially launched for the Neo Geo MVS (arcade), the title was later released for both Neo Geo AES (home) and Neo Geo CD respectively, in addition of being ported and re-released through download services for various consoles. It was received with mixed reception from critics and reviewers since its initial release. In 1996, a sequel titled Stakes Winner 2 was released for the arcades.

Gameplay 

Stakes Winner is a thoroughbred horse racing game similar to Winning Post, where players take control of any of the available horses, each with their own strengths and weaknesses, to compete against either AI opponents or other human players across multiple races. Players control their horse with the joystick while two action buttons are used; one controlling the reins for small accelerations that drains little portions of the horse's stamina and another for the whip for fast speed, which drastically consumes stamina from the horse and if the stamina is depleted completely, racing is given up for a short period. Two quick taps on the joystick at any direction allows the horse to push back an opponent in front of them, however two quick taps on the opposite side reduces speed. Power-ups also spawn on the race track for players to pick up. Failing to qualify for the next race results in a game over screen unless players insert more credits into the arcade machine to continue playing.

Development and release 
Stakes Winner was developed by Saurus, with additional support from AM Factory, and the project was first announced in mid-1995 across Japanese publications such as Neo Geo Freak, with previews showcasing various differences compared to the final release. The game was first released by SNK for the Neo Geo MVS on September 27, 1995 and was then published for Neo Geo AES on October 27 of the same year. The North American AES release has since become one of the more expensive titles on the platform, with copies fetching over US$4000 on the secondary video game collecting market. The game was later re-released by Saurus for the Neo Geo CD and released only in Japan on March 22, 1996. The title was later ported by Saurus to the PlayStation and Sega Saturn, both of which were released on December 6, 1996. It has since received multiple re-releases in recent years on various digital distribution platforms such as the Virtual Console, Nintendo eShop, PlayStation Network and Xbox Live.

Reception 

Stakes Winner was met with mixed reception from critics and reviewers since its release. In Japan, Game Machine listed it on their November 1, 1995 issue as being the fourth most-successful arcade game of the month, outperforming titles such as Puzzle Bobble 2, Virtua Striker and Street Fighter Alpha.

Sequel 
A sequel, Stakes Winner 2 was released in 1996 for the arcades, Neo Geo AES, PlayStation and Sega Saturn. It was later re-released in recent years for the Virtual Console, PlayStation Network, Nintendo eShop and Xbox Live.

Notes

References

External links 
 Stakes Winner at GameFAQs
 Stakes Winner at Killer List of Videogames
 Stakes Winner at MobyGames

1995 video games
ACA Neo Geo games
Arcade video games
D4 Enterprise games
Head-to-head arcade video games
Horse racing video games
Multiplayer and single-player video games
Neo Geo games
Neo Geo CD games
Nintendo Switch games
PlayStation (console) games
PlayStation 4 games
PlayStation Network games
Racing video games
Saurus games
Sega Saturn games
SNK games
Video game franchises introduced in 1995
Virtual Console games
Windows games
Xbox One games
Video games developed in Japan
Hamster Corporation games